Cqu may refer to:

 Central Queensland University in Australia
 Chongqing University in China